A pyogenic liver abscess is a type of liver abscess caused by bacteria.

Signs and symptoms

Acute abscess
 Fever
 Lethargy
 Discomfort in right upper quadrant of abdomen
 Anorexia
 Enlarged and tender liver
 Pleural effusion

Chronic abscess
 Fever
 Abdominal discomfort
 Enlarged liver

Cause
 Biliary disease (most common)
E.g.: stones, cholangiocarcinoma
 Colonic disease
E.g.: diverticulitis, appendicitis, Crohn's disease
 Cryptogenic disease
 Pancreatitis
 Infection of blood
 Intra-abdominal sepsis
 Infection of biliary system
 Traumatic introduction
E.g.: penetrating injury, iatrogenic (radiofrequency ablation)

Common bacterial causes
 Streptococcus milleri
 E. coli
 Streptococcus fecalis
 Klebsiella pneumoniae
 Proteus vulgaris
 Bacteroides
 Opportunistic pathogens (Staphylococcus)

Diagnosis
To differentiate pyogenic liver abscess from amoebic liver abscess, several features such as subjects with age more than 50 years with lungs involvement, multiple liver abscesses, with amoebic serologic titres less than 1:256 can help to pin down the diagnosis of pyogenic liver abscess.
 Blood CP (no leucocytosis)
 Haemoglobin estimation (anaemia)
 Serum albumin levels (falls rapidly)
 USG and CT scanning
 Guided aspiration to confirm the diagnosis

Treatment
 Antibiotics
 Penicillins
 Aminoglycosides
 Metronidazole
 Cephalosporins
 Percutaneous drainage under USG or CT control
 Laparotomy in intra-abdominal disease

References

External links 

Hepatology